Aubrey Duckworth MacKenzie (23 October 1894 – 15 July 1933) was an Australian rules footballer who played with Melbourne and St Kilda in the Victorian Football League (VFL).

A Brunswick junior, MacKenzie appeared twice for Melbourne in the 1914 VFL season before enlisting in the armed forces and serving during the war.

MacKenzie was a member of Footscray's 1919 and 1920 Victorian Football Association premiership sides when he returned from the war and signed with St Kilda for the 1922 season. The South African born ruckman spent three years with St Kilda and helped turn a struggling outfit into a winning team.

In 1931, McKenzie was elected as President of the Corowa Football Club in the Ovens and Murray Football League. He also acted as their football coach in 1931, as a volunteer, receiving no remuneration.

MacKenzie died on 15 July 1933, when he was beheaded in a motor vehicle accident near Broadford, Victoria.

He was survived by his wife, Lillian, and his two children, Audrey and Maxie.

References

1894 births
1933 deaths
VFL/AFL players born outside Australia
Melbourne Football Club players
St Kilda Football Club players
Footscray Football Club (VFA) players
South African emigrants to Australia
Australian rules footballers from Victoria (Australia)
Road incident deaths in Victoria (Australia)
Deaths by decapitation
Australian military personnel of World War I